Irwin County is a county located in the U.S. state of Georgia.  As of the 2020 census, the population was 9,666. The county seat is Ocilla. The county was created on December 15, 1818. It was named for Governor Jared Irwin.

In the last years of the American Civil War, Irwin County gained the nickname of the Republic of Irwin due to the Unionism of many of its residents. The location where Jefferson Davis was captured  is located in Irwin County near Irwinville.

History
The territories of Appling, Irwin, and Early counties were land newly ceded in 1814 and 1818. These counties were created by a legislative act on December 15, 1818. All or portions of Irwin's five adjacent counties were created from Irwin county along with all of Cook, Colquitt, Lanier, Lowndes, counties and portions of Atkinson, Brooks, Echols, Wilcox, and Worth counties. Irwin was divided into 16 districts of 20 miles and 10 chains square with lots of 70 chains square containing 490 acres according to the Act of 1818. In 1820 each lot was priced at $18, but by 1831 the price was down to $5 per lot.

Irwin County had 372 white residents and 39 slaves in 1820, when the census covered a large portion of central south Georgia. In 1825, Lowndes County was formed out of the 8th, 9th, 10th, 11th, 12th, 15th, and 16th land districts in what was then the southern half of the county. In 1830, the county had 1,066 whites, 109 slaves, and 5 free people of color. In 1840, Irwin County had 1,772 whites and 266 slaves. In 1850. Irwin County had 2,874 whites, 459 slaves, and 1 free person of color. In 1853, Worth County was formed out of part of Irwin County. In 1854, Coffee County was also formed from Irwin. In 1860, Irwin County had 1,453 whites and 246 slaves. It was one of a few counties in Georgia outside of mountainous northern Georgia with slaves accounting for a small percentage of its population.

Civil War
During the American Civil War, like the United States in general, Irwin County was also ideologically divided. The county was one of the poorest at the time in Georgia. It was home to a number of Southern Unionists who opposed secession and the Confederacy. The county also provided several regiments to the Confederate Army including:
 Company F "Irwin Volunteers", 49th Regiment Georgia Infantry.

In May 1863, several companies of Duncan Lamont Clinch Jr's Fourth Georgia Cavalry were charged with searching Irwin County for deserters. They spent a month searching the county, but were only able to find twenty-two deserters on May 22, the day they arrived. The deserters were sent to Savannah for enlistment or prosecution.

A prominent Unionist in the county was Willis Jackson Bone. He lived west of Irwinville, near the Alapaha River. He was a miller and operated a steam-powered mill on what was then Bones Pond and presently Crystal Lake. Because he was a gristmill operator, Bone was exempt from conscription. During the Civil War, he helped a number of escaped slaves, Confederate deserters, and escaped Union prisoners hide in the swamps along the river. In February 1865, Bone and a large assembly of others gathered in Irwinville. Those assembled declared Irwin County part of the Union again. A lieutenant of the local militia protested the action, but was knocked down with a musket by Bone. Three cheers for Abraham Lincoln followed. The assembly then took after the lieutenant and the enrolling officer Gideon Brown. They and other Confederate sympathizers were chased out of town and threatened with death if they should return. Willis Jackson Bone was hanged near his pond in late April 1865 after he killed a local justice of the peace named Jack Walker while Bone was bringing food to an escaped slave named Toney. Walker had tried to take Toney into custody.

A few months later, Irwinville became the site of the capture of Confederate President Jefferson Davis. Davis was on his way from the capital of the Confederacy at Richmond, Virginia to board a ship with his family and flee to safety in England, Davis stopped at a hotel in Irwinville owned by Doctor G.E. White on the evening of May 9, 1865. There he conversed and socialized with the locals and no one had suspected that they were in the presence of a man of such esteem. Davis and his family moved to an encampment beside a nearby creek bed only a couple of miles from the hotel after they were done talking with the citizens of Irwinville and sometime in the early morning of May 10, the encampment was alarmed by the sound of gunfire. Davis tried to escape towards the creek wearing an overcoat and his wife had tied her scarf around his shoulders, but members of the First Wisconsin and Fourth Michigan Cavalry Regiments  captured him. He was taken to Fortress Monroe, Virginia and held for two years. The location is now the Jefferson Davis Memorial Historic Site.

Geography

The majority and entire central and western portion of Irwin County, bordered by a line running southeast from Fitzgerald, is located in the Alapaha River sub-basin of the Suwannee River basin. The eastern corner of the county is located in the Satilla River sub-basin of the St. Marys-Satilla River basin

Major highways

  U.S. Route 129
  U.S. Route 319
  State Route 11
  State Route 32
  State Route 35
  State Route 90
  State Route 107
  State Route 125
  State Route 158
  State Route 206

Adjacent counties
 Ben Hill County (north)  (created 1906 from Irwin and Wilcox counties)
 Coffee County (east)  (created in 1854 from Clinch, Irwin, Telfair, and Ware counties.)
 Berrien County (south)  (created in 1856 from Coffee, Irwin, and Lowndes counties)
 Tift County (southwest)  (created 1905 from Berrien, Irwin, and Worth counties.)
 Turner County (northwest)  (created from Dooly, Irwin, Wilcox, and Worth counties)

Demographics

2000 census
As of the census of 2000, there were 9,931 people, 3,644 households, and 2,696 families living in the county. There were 4,149 housing units at an average density of 12 per square mile (4/km2). The racial makeup of the county was 71.98% White, 25.88% Black or African American, 0.06% Native American, 0.32% Asian, 0.01% Pacific Islander, 1.25% from other races, and 0.50% from two or more races.  2.03% of the population were Hispanic or Latino of any race.

There were 3,644 households, out of which 35.20% had children under the age of 18 living with them, 55.50% were married couples living together, 14.40% had a female householder with no husband present, and 26.00% were non-families. 23.10% of all households were made up of individuals, and 11.30% had someone living alone who was 65 years of age or older.  The average household size was 2.62 and the average family size was 3.07.

In the county, the population was spread out, with 28.80% under the age of 18, 9.20% from 18 to 24, 26.10% from 25 to 44, 21.90% from 45 to 64, and 14.10% who were 65 years of age or older.  The median age was 35 years. For every 100 females, there were 96.60 males.  For every 100 females age 18 and over, there were 89.10 males.

The median income for a household in the county was $30,257, and the median income for a family was $35,234. Males had a median income of $28,827 versus $20,532 for females. The per capita income for the county was $14,867.  About 13.50% of families and 17.80% of the population were below the poverty line, including 23.30% of those under age 18 and 20.80% of those age 65 or over.

2010 census
As of the 2010 United States Census, there were 9,538 people, 3,495 households, and 2,475 families living in the county. The racial makeup of the county was 71.4% white, 25.9% black or African American, 0.6% Asian, 1.1% from other races, and 0.9% from two or more races. Those of Hispanic or Latino origin made up 2.4% of the population. In terms of ancestry, 16.4% were American, 13.1% were English, and 9.3% were Irish.

Of the 3,495 households, 35.5% had children under the age of 18 living with them, 49.0% were married couples living together, 17.0% had a female householder with no husband present, 29.2% were non-families, and 25.8% of all households were made up of individuals. The average household size was 2.54 and the average family size was 3.05. The median age was 38.8 years.

The median income for a household in the county was $38,376 and the median income for a family was $51,262. Males had a median income of $40,070 versus $23,786 for females. The per capita income for the county was $16,561. About 14.9% of families and 25.4% of the population were below the poverty line, including 34.1% of those under age 18 and 15.3% of those age 65 or over.

2020 census

As of the 2020 United States census, there were 9,666 people, 3,329 households, and 2,090 families residing in the county.

Communities

City
 Ocilla

Unincorporated communities
 Irwinville
 Mystic
 Waterloo
 Wray

Politics

See also

 National Register of Historic Places listings in Irwin County, Georgia
List of counties in Georgia

References

External links
 Dorminy's Meeting House historical marker
 Irwin County historical marker

 
Georgia (U.S. state) counties
1818 establishments in Georgia (U.S. state)
Populated places established in 1818
Fitzgerald, Georgia micropolitan area
Southern Unionists in the American Civil War